WKIC (1390 AM) is a radio station in Hazard, Kentucky. The station was known as WKIC for over sixty years, before assuming the call sign WZQQ when the WKIC call sign was moved to the FM dial at 97.9. The station is currently owned by Mountain Broadcasting Service, Inc. and features programming from ABC Radio and Jones Radio Network.

The station reassumed the WKIC call sign on February 12, 2019.

References

External links

KIC (AM)
Hazard, Kentucky
Radio stations established in 1947
1947 establishments in Kentucky
KIC
Contemporary hit radio stations in the United States